Hua Islet is an islet in Huayu Village, Wangan Township, Penghu County (the Pescadores), Taiwan. Hua Islet is the westernmost point in Penghu (the Pescadores). The island has also been known as "West Islet". The Japanese-built Huayu Lighthouse (Hua Islet Lighthouse) is located on the southwestern hill of the island.

Ferries run periodically between Magong and Hua Islet as well as between Wangan Island and Hua Islet.

History

Huayu Lighthouse (Hua Islet Lighthouse) was built in 1939 as part of Japanese military planning for the area.

The handover of Taiwan to the Republic of China occurred in 1945. Huayu Village was established in 1946.

Residents on the island originally used a deep well for water. Over time, the well has dried up and a seawater desalination plant was built in 2019. On August 11, 2019, the desalination plant failed, leading to complaints from the residents. The plant was restored to normal operation by August 20.

On the afternoon of October 5, 2019, an unnamed ship from China was caught violating Taiwanese waters  to the northwest of Hua Islet. The ship was boarded and the crew arrested.

Geography

The island is shaped like a triangle.

The island is granitic making it geologically distinct from the other islands in Penghu (the Pescadores).

See also 
 List of islands of Taiwan

Gallery

References

External links
 花嶼燈塔 ('Hua Islet Lighthouse') 

Islands of Taiwan
Landforms of Penghu County